Helga Baum (née Dlubek, born 1954) is a German mathematician. She is professor for differential geometry and global analysis in the Institute for Mathematics of the Humboldt University of Berlin.

Education
Baum earned a doctorate (Dr. sc. nat.) in mathematics in 1980 at the Humboldt University of Berlin.

Books
Baum of the author or coauthor of books including:
Conformal differential geometry: Q-curvature and conformal holonomy, with Andreas Juhl, Birkhäuser, 2010
Eichfeldtheorie: Eine Einführung in die Differentialgeometrie auf Faserbündeln [Gauge theory: An introduction into differential geometry on fibre bundles] (Springer, 2009; 2nd ed., 2014)
Twistor and Killing spinors on Riemannian manifolds, with Thomas Friedrich, Ralf Grunewald, and Ines Kath, Teubner, 1991
Spin-Strukturen und Dirac-Operatoren über pseudoriemannschen Mannigfaltigkeiten [Spin structures and Dirac operators on pseudo-Riemannian manifolds], Teubner, 1981

References

Year of birth missing (living people)
Living people
20th-century German mathematicians
German women mathematicians
Humboldt University of Berlin alumni
Academic staff of the Humboldt University of Berlin
21st-century German mathematicians
20th-century German women
21st-century German women